Rolan Lenard Milligan (born August 16, 1994) is an American football safety who is currently a member of the Saskatchewan Roughriders of the Canadian Football League (CFL). He played college football at UAB in 2014 and transferred to Toledo in 2015 after the University of Alabama at Birmingham cancelled its football program. Milligan has also been a member of the Dallas Cowboys, Detroit Lions, and Indianapolis Colts.

Early years
Milligan attended Lake Wales High School, where he played as a quarterback. He received honorable-mention 5A all-state honors as a senior. He enrolled at Reedley College. As a sophomore, he registered 44 tackles, 3 interceptions and 2 fumble recoveries. He transferred to the University of Alabama at Birmingham after the season. As a junior, he started in 8 out of 12 games, collecting 54 tackles (second on the team), 2 sacks, 4 tackles for loss, and 6 passes defensed. He transferred to the University of Toledo after UAB announced the cancelling of its football program. As a senior, he started in 8 out of 11 games, while playing as a nickelback. He tallied 48 tackles, 2 interceptions, 3 passes defensed and 3 forced fumbles. He had 9 tackles and 2 passes defensed against No. 24 ranked Temple University.

Professional career

Dallas Cowboys
Milligan was signed as an undrafted free agent by the Dallas Cowboys after the 2016 NFL Draft on May 9. He was waived/injured on August 4, 2016 and placed on injured reserve. He was released by the team on August 16.

Detroit Lions
On February 9, 2017, Milligan signed as a free agent with the Detroit Lions. He was waived on September 2, 2017 and was signed to the Lions' practice squad the next day. He was promoted to the active roster on November 27, 2017. He was waived on December 9, 2017 and later re-signed to the practice squad. He signed a reserve/future contract with the Lions on January 1, 2018. On September 1, 2018, Milligan was waived by the Lions and was signed to the practice squad the next day. He was released on September 5, 2018. He was re-signed to the practice squad on October 3, 2018, but was released three days later.

Indianapolis Colts
On October 23, 2018, Milligan was signed to the Indianapolis Colts practice squad. He was promoted to the active roster on December 22, 2018, but was waived six days later and re-signed to the practice squad. He was promoted back to the active roster on January 9, 2019. On September 2, 2019, Milligan was waived by the Colts and re-signed to the practice squad. He was promoted to the active roster on September 11, 2019. He was placed on injured reserve on December 18, 2019. Milligan signed the exclusive rights tender with the Colts on March 28, 2020. On August 5, 2020, he announced he would opt out of the 2020 season due to the COVID-19 pandemic. On August 6, 2021, Milligan was waived by the Colts.

Saskatchewan Roughriders 
On October 24, 2021 Milligan signed with the Saskatchewan Roughriders of the Canadian Football League (CFL).

References

External links
Toledo Rockets bio

1994 births
Living people
Dallas Cowboys players
Detroit Lions players
Indianapolis Colts players
People from Lake Wales, Florida
Players of American football from Florida
Reedley Tigers football players
Sportspeople from Polk County, Florida
Toledo Rockets football players
UAB Blazers football players
Saskatchewan Roughriders players